The ashy black titi monkey (Plecturocebus cinerascens) is a species of titi monkey, a type of New World monkey, endemic to Brazil. It was originally described as Callithrix cinerascens in 1823.

References

ashy black titi
Mammals of Brazil
Endemic fauna of Brazil
ashy black titi
Taxa named by Johann Baptist von Spix